The following is a partial list of First Nations peoples of Canada, organized by linguistic-cultural area. It only includes First Nations people, which by definition excludes Metis and Canadian Inuit groups. The areas used here are in accordance to those developed by the ethnologist and linguist Edward Sapir, and used by the Canadian Museum of Civilization.

Northwest Coast
These people traditionally eat fish, primarily salmon and eulachon from the ocean, as well as fish from lakes and rivers, and roots and berries. Recently discovered clam gardens suggest that they were not limited only to hunting and gathering. They made use of the forests of the Pacific to build dug-out canoes, and houses made of evenly split planks of wood. They used tools made of stone and wood. The native peoples of the Pacific coast also make totem poles, a trait attributed to other tribes as well. In 2000 a land claim was settled between the Nisga'a people of British Columbia and the provincial government, resulting in the return of over 2,000 square kilometres of land to the Nisga'a. Major ethnicities include the:
Coast Salish peoples
Shishalh (Sechelt)
Squamish
Pentlatch (a.k.a. Puntledge, extinct)
Qualicum
Comox-speaking:
K'omoks (Kwak'wala speaking today)
Sliammon 
Homalco
Klahoose
Halkomelem-speaking
Hulquminum (Island Halkomelem):
Hwlitsum (Lamalcha or Lamalchi)
Snuneymuxw (Nanaimo)
Snaw-naw-as (Nanoose)
Cowichan
Somena (S’amuna’)
Quw'utsun
Quamichan
Clemclemaluts (L’uml’umuluts)
Comiaken (Qwum’yiqun’)
Khenipsen (Hinupsum)
Kilpahlas (Tl’ulpalus)
Koksilah (Hwulqwselu)
Penelakut
Hunquminum (Downriver Halkomelem)
Musqueam
Tsleil-Waututh (Burrard)
Katzie
Kwantlen
Kwikwetlem (Coquitlam)
Snokomish (extinct)
Tsawwassen
Halqemeylem (Upriver Halkomelem)
Sts'Ailes (Chehalis)
Sto:lo (Fraser River Salish)
Aitchelitz
Leq'á:mel
Matsqui
Popkum
Skway
Skawahlook
Skowkale
Squiala
Sumas
Tzeachten
Yakweakwioose
Chawathil
Cheam
Kwaw-kwaw-Apilt
Sq'éwlets (Scowlitz)
Seabird Island
Shxw'ow'hamel
Soowahlie
North Straits Salish-speaking
Songhees (a.k.a. Songish, a.k.a. Lekwungen)
T'Souke (Sooke)
Semiahmoo
Malahat
Lummi
Klallam
Tsartlip
Tsawout
Tseycum
Pauquachin
Esquimalt
New Westminster (no language affiliation)
Nuxálk (Bella Coola)
Kimsquit
Tallheo
Stuie
Kwatna
Tsimshianic peoples (Northern Mainland)
Tsimshian (Sm'algyax speaking)
Gitxsan (Gitxsanimaax speaking)
Nisga'a
Haida (Haad kil speaking)
Southern Wakashan peoples
Nuu-chah-nulth (incorrectly called Nootka)
Tla-o-qui-aht (Clayoquot)
Mowachaht-Muchalaht
Ahousaht (formed from the merger of the Ahousaht and Kelsemeht bands in 1951)
Ehattesaht
Hesquiaht
Cheklesahht
Kyuquot
Nuchatlaht
Huu-ay-aht (formerly Ohiaht)
Hupacasath (formerly Opetchesaht)
Toquaht
Tseshaht
Uchucklesaht
Yuułuʔiłʔatḥ (Ucluelet)
Ditidaht
Pacheedaht
Northern Wakashan peoples (Central Coast)
Kwakwaka'wakw
Laich-kwil-tach (Euclataws/Yuculta a.k.a. Southern Kwakiutl)
Weewaikai (Cape Mudge)
Wewaykum (Campbell River)
Kwiakah
Koskimo
'Namgis (Nimpkish)
Haisla (Kitamaat)
Henaksiala
Heiltsuk (Bella Bella, at the community of the same name)
Wuikinuxv (Owekeeno)
Tsetsaut (extinct Athapaskan-speakers)

Plains

These people traditionally used tipis covered with skins as their homes. Their main sustenance was the bison, which they used as food, as well as for all their garments. The leaders of some Plains tribes wore large headdresses made of feathers, something which is wrongfully attributed by some to all First Nations peoples. Major ethnicities include the:
 Anishinaabe
 Plains-Ojibwa
 Blackfoot
 Kainai (Blood)
 North Peigan
 Siksika
 Dene
 Chipewyan
 Nakoda
 Assiniboine
 Stoney
 Plains-Cree
 Tsuut'ina (Sarcee)

Plateau
 Ktunaxa (Kootenay)
 Okanagan
 Sinixt
 St'at'imc (Lillooet)
 Lil'wat
Lower Stl'atl'imx (Skatin, Semahquam, Xa'xtsa)
Nequatque
 Nicola
 Nicola Athapaskans (extinct)
 Nlaka'pamux (Thompson)
 Secwepemc (Shuswap)

Western subarctic
These peoples live in the boreal forest in what are now Canada's western provinces and territories. They were originally hunter-gatherers dependent on caribou, moose and the fur trade. Most spoke Athapaskan languages except the Crees and Inland Tlingit. Major ethnicities in the Yukon, Northwest Territories and the northern parts of the western provinces (British Columbia, Alberta, Saskatchewan and Manitoba) include the following:
Cree
Dakelh (Carrier)
Wet'suwet'en
Lheidli T'enneh 
Dene
Chipewyan
Sahtu (includes Bearlake, Hare and Mountain peoples)
Slavey
Tlicho
Yellowknives
Dane-zaa (also Dunne-za, Beaver, Tasttine)
Gwich'in (Kutchin, Loucheaux)
Hän
Kaska
Sekani
Tagish
Tahltan
Inland Tlingit
Áa Tlein Kwáan (Atlin people)
Deisleen Kwáan (Teslin people)
Tsilhqot'in (Chilcotin)
Southern and Northern Tutchone

Woodlands and eastern subarctic

Major ethnicities include the:
Abenaki
Anishinaabe
Algonquin
Nipissing
Ojibwa
Mississaugas
Saulteaux
Oji-cree
Ottawa (Odawa)
Potawatomi
Cree
Innu
Naskapi

Atlantic coastal region
Beothuk (Newfoundland extinct)
Innu (Labrador)
Maliseet
Mi'kmaq (Micmac)
Passamaquoddy
Hydin

St. Lawrence River Valley
The largest First Nations group near the St. Lawrence waterway are the Iroquois. This area also includes the Wyandot (formerly referred to as the Huron) peoples of central Ontario, and the League of Five Nations who had lived in the United States, south of Lake Ontario.  Major ethnicities include the:
Anishinaabe
Algonquin
Nipissing
Haudenosaunee (Iroquois)
Cayuga (Guyohkohnyo)
Mohawk (Kanien'kéhaka)
Oneida (Onayotekaono)
Onondaga (Onundagaono)
Seneca (Onondowahgah)
Tuscarora (Ska-Ruh-Reh)
Munsee branch of the Lenape (Delawares)
Neutral
Petun (Tobacco)
Wyandot (Huron)

See also

Classification of indigenous peoples of the Americas
Indigenous languages of the Americas
List of Canadian Inuit
List of First Nations governments
List of Indian reserves in Canada
List of Indian reserves in Canada by population
List of place names in Canada of Aboriginal origin
Notable Aboriginal people of Canada

Notes

First Nations
First Nations peoples
First Nations